Rendell is a surname. Notable people with the surname include:

Alexander Rendell (born 1990), Thai actor, singer and environmentalist
Don Rendell (1926–2015), English jazz musician and arranger
Ed Rendell (born 1944), American lawyer and politician, former Governor of Pennsylvania
James Rendell (born 1980), English cricketer
Joan Rendell (1921–2010), English historian, writer and phillumenist
Marjorie Rendell (born 1947), American federal judge, former First Lady of Pennsylvania
Martha Rendell (1871–1909), Australian murderer
Matt Rendell (born 1959), Australian rules footballer
Ruth Rendell (1930–2015), British mystery writer
Scott Rendell (born 1986), English footballer
Stephen Rendell (1819–1893), English-Canadian merchant and politician
Stuart Rendell (born 1972), Australian hammer thrower

See also
 Rendell (given name)
 Rendel
 Rendall
 Randall (disambiguation)

English-language surnames
English masculine given names